Amy Smith (born 10 November 1998) is an Australian rules footballer playing for the North Melbourne Football Club in the AFL Women's competition (AFLW). Smith was drafted by North Melbourne with the 55th pick overall in the 2020 AFL Women's draft. She was the first father-daughter selection for the club, being the daughter of Shaun Smith who played 47 games for the men's team.

Prior to being drafted, Smith played with Williamstown in the VFL Women's competition and with Aberfeldie in the EDFL competition.

References

External links 

1998 births
Living people
North Melbourne Football Club (AFLW) players
Australian rules footballers from Victoria (Australia)